Burford Capital, founded in 2009, provides specialized finance to the legal market. It operates as a finance and professional services company worldwide with principal offices in New York, London and Chicago. The company offers financing to lawyers and clients engaged in litigation and arbitration, asset recovery and other legal finance and advisory activities.

History

Burford was founded by Christopher Bogart as a way to fund legal cases. Bogart came up with the idea discussing legal funding with a colleague over dinner. The company was launched with Jonathan Molot in 2009. 

Burford has been publicly traded on the London AIM Stock Exchange (BUR:LN)  since October 2009 and issued further shares in a follow-on in 2010. In 2017, Burford received the AIM Award for Innovative Fundraising of the Year.

On 7 August 2019, Muddy Waters Research announced that it was short Burford, citing issues, as Muddy Waters saw it, with Burford's fair value accounting practices and of "egregiously misrepresenting" its returns on invested capital and rates of return.  Burford countered each of the seven claims made by Muddy Waters, raising what it called “many factual inaccuracies”. On 12 August 2019, Burford announced it had identified evidence consistent with “illegal market manipulation” of its shares in the run up to a short attack. Three days later, on 15 August 2019, Burford announced the replacement of its chief finance officer, the spouse of the chief executive officer.

On 21 June 2021, Burford Capital announced it had successfully been paid $103m USD, resulting from the divorce settlement between Farkhad Akhmedov, a Russian businessman and Tatiana Akhmedova.  Bloomberg claims the total settlement was $186m USD. Burford Capital were successful in financing the litigation and were paid over 55% of the total settlement, which contributed $20m to its 2021 operating profit, according to Burford Capital.

References

External links
Burford Capital Home Page

Companies listed on the London Stock Exchange
Companies listed on the New York Stock Exchange
Financial services companies based in London
Financial services companies based in New York City
Lawsuits
Legal costs